Edward E. Bluthardt (December 16, 1916 – August 3, 1993) was an American politician and lawyer.

Born in Chicago, Illinois, Bluthardt went to the Chicago Public Schools. He served in the United States Army during World War II and was commissioned a lieutenant. Bluthardt received his bachelor's degree from Illinois College and his law degree from John Marshall Law School. Bluthardt practiced law and lived in Schiller Park, Illinois. He served as mayor of Schiller Park and was a Republican. Bluthardt served in the Illinois House of Representatives from 1967 to 1983. Bluthardt died at Resurrection Medical Center in Chicago, Illinois.

Notes

External links

1916 births
1993 deaths
Politicians from Chicago
Military personnel from Illinois
Illinois College alumni
John Marshall Law School (Chicago) alumni
Illinois lawyers
Mayors of places in Illinois
Republican Party members of the Illinois House of Representatives
20th-century American politicians
United States Army personnel of World War II
United States Army officers
20th-century American lawyers